Bill Dykes (born Howard William Dykes in Cincinnati, Ohio, in 1946) is an American gospel music singer.

The son of a Baptist preacher, Dykes became his father's music director at age 12 because there was no one else to serve and he was willing to do it. Since then he has had the privilege of being mentored musically by several of the greatest musicians in gospel music, and has sung throughout all of North America and in other countries, in literally thousands of churches.

History
Dykes started singing with The Chancellor Quartet from Hamilton, Ohio, when he was just 19 years old. Big Dave Stewart sang bass, Floyd Arthur Jr. (quartet founder) sang lead, Frank Ferrell sang tenor, and Dykes sang baritone.

Dykes then joined The Rhythm Masters from Cincinnati, featuring Buddy Lyles (of The Florida Boys), Dan Hubbard, Grady "Chico" Nix (The Prophits), and Bill Phelps (The Hemphills). They remain great friends today. In October 2006, The Rhythm Masters joined together for a reunion concert in northern Kentucky.

In 1970, Dykes joined Coy Cook & The Senators from Pensacola, Florida. At that time, the Senators were owned by renowned gospel music promoter J.G. Whitfield, who also owned The Singing News. The Senators consisted of Coy Cook, Mac Evans, Calvin Runyon, and Nick Bruno. Not long after Dykes joined The Senators, Nick Bruno left and was replaced by Ralph Jarmin. Mac Evans left and was replaced by Don Burris. The Senators headlined and opened for all of J.G. Whitfield's concerts. Every major act typically performed at Bonnifay, Florida, where literally thousands of people set up tents and sat outside in lawn chairs waiting for their favorite groups to come up on the flatbed truck stage.

After leaving the Senators in 1972, Dykes joined the famous Cathedral Quartet of Stowe, Ohio. Members of the group at that time were George Younce, Glenn Payne, Roy Tremble and Jim Garstand (pianist). The Cathedrals were not as well known as they became in the '80s and beyond; in the early '70s they were just launching their ministry after being on the Rex Humbard Cathedral of Tomorrow program.  Dykes had the privilege to perform on an album that reached #1 in the gospel charts, The Last Sunday.  In total, he performed on 4 LP albums with the Cathedral Quartet, including The Last Sunday, Town & Country, and Somebody Loves Me.  He recounts, "Singing with the Cathedral Quartet with their sound and professionalism was probably one of the greatest experiences in my music profession and something that I'll always be grateful for."

In 1974, while sharing the stage with Jerry & The Singing Goffs in New Brunswick, Dykes was offered a position with the band.  He accepted, and moved from Stowe, Ohio to Nashville, Tennessee to start his entertainment career.  The members of the Goffs were Jerry Goff, Dave Thomas (tenor), Gary Valentine, Gene Jones, Wally Goff, & Andrea "LeFeaver" Goff. Before too long they went through a major change and hired Buck Buckles to sing tenor, while Jerry continued singing lead and Bill sang baritone; Gene Jones was on the piano; Barry Hess played bass guitar, and Wally Goff played the Hammond B3 organ.

Of The Singing Goffs, Dykes said, "This was without a doubt one of the greatest group of gospel entertainers & musicians that I ever had the privilege of working with. Most people wouldn't know that Jerry Goff was one of the finest preachers that I ever sat under. When I was with The Goffs, we did many three-day crusades and saw many, many folks come to the saving knowledge of Christ."

Dykes recently had the privilege of participating in an interview with Dr. Jerry Goff and Gayle Tackett at the 2008 National Quartet Convention in Louisville, KY.  It will be part of a soon to be released documentary of Dr. Jerry Goff.

When Dykes left The Goffs, it was to take the position of Vice President and Director of A&R for QCA Records in Cincinnati, Ohio. He then got back together with The Rhythm Masters, then owned by Carroll & Linda Rawlings.  He said of the experience, "We had a young 18 year old talent by the name of Rene Taube - this was her first experience of singing with a group and gospel music of any sort. We had a #1 song, "God Rides on Wings of Love," during that time, and another chart song, "It's About Time"."

In 1985, Dykes started a group called Chariot in Cincinnati, Ohio. He said, "The original members of Chariot were Larry Orrell, Gayle Tacket, and Charles Novell and I. Over the past 22 years, we've changed members many times because we were a part-time group that usually sang corporate shows and private parties."

Personal life
Although Dykes has been a businessman and professional for the past 25 years, he still sings in churches around the United States.

References

Bill Dykes - From 1972 through 1974, William “Bill” Dykes was the Cathedral Quartet’s baritone. He then left to spend four years with Jerry & the Singing Goffs. During a brief period in ~1979-80, he came back, until the Cathedrals hired Steve Lee.

July 23, 2008 - Renowned Christian Gospel Singer Dr. Bill Dykes Joins Sky Angel Team

Bill Dykes Scheduled to Appear on “Seniors Today” January 7 on Atlanta ’s Channel 57 (WATC)
(Written by Staff on January 5, 2010)

THE PRESTIGIOUS DIAMOND AWARDS (Jun 2, 2011) Bill Dykes of Mansion Entertainment is excited about this year’s program in Branson. “We are looking forward to being apart of the Diamond Awards this year. In my 45-year career singing Gospel Music I have seen, been a part of, and observed, many types of Award Shows. There is something special about the Diamond Awards!”

Bill Dykes to Open for Mike Huckabee in Davis College Gala Event in Binghamton, NY
Legendary quartet man, Bill Dykes, continues to prove that his style of music is alive and well, from Southern Gospel's Deep South roots to upstate New York, as he joins Mike Huckabee in a Binghamton, NY Gala fundraiser at Davis College Oct 1, 2010.
By: EHA-Nashville
  

Aug. 14, 2010 
Jerry and the Singing Goffs to be honored at Creekside 2015
Pigeon Forge TN (October 13, 2015) – The 2015 Creekside Gospel Music Convention will host

1946 births
Living people
American male singers
American gospel singers
Southern gospel performers
Musicians from Cincinnati